Tōrere, previously known as Torere, is a small settlement in the Ōpōtiki District of the Bay of Plenty Region on New Zealand's North Island. It is the ancestral home of the Ngāitai people.

One of the area's largest businesses is Torere Macadamias, an organic-macadamia farm established on land not suited to other forms of agriculture.

The farm featured on Country Calendar in 2017. Macadamia research from the farm has been presented at the University of Hawaii. The farm is now a major global producer of macadamias and related products.

Marae

Tōrere has a marae. It includes the Holy Trinity Memorial Church, a 1950s church decorated with carved pillars, tukutuku panels and stained-glass windows.

Its  World War II Roll of Honour includes the names of almost 40 local men who served in the Māori Battalion, including eight killed in action.

History

The bodies of two girls washed ashore at Torere in 1900. They were among 16 children and two adults who had drowned while crossing the Moto River, 13 kilometres south-west, days earlier.

The body of a 54-year-old woman washed ashore at Torere in 2017.

A hui, held in Torere in August 2018, found locals were opposed to a national Māori Battalion Museum being established at Waitangi to commemorate local men who served or died during World War II.

Education

It was established on 27 February 1878 with as a Māori school with fifteen pupils. It functioned as a post office, telephone exchange and birth, death and marriage registry during the early 19th century. It became a general school in 1969, and became a Māori immersion school in 2001.

The school features a carved gateway.

References

Ōpōtiki District
Populated places in the Bay of Plenty Region